Dennis Thering (born April 5, 1984, in Hamburg) is a German politician of the Christian Democratic Union of Germany (CDU) and chairman of the CDU parliamentary group in the Hamburg Parliament. He has been a member of the Hamburg Parliament since 2011 and has been chairman of the parliamentary opposition since the 2020 elections.

Education and professional career 
Dennis Thering graduated from the Wirtschaftsgymnasium City Nord, a secondary school in Hamburg with a focus on economics, in 2003. After graduating, he spent one year doing community service at the Hospital zum Heiligen Geist ("Holy Spirit Hospital") in the Poppenbüttel quarter of Hamburg. Thering then completed an apprenticeship as a bank clerk at the German public savings bank Hamburger Sparkasse in 2006, where he then worked for four years. In 2010, he went back to school to study political science - he eventually earned his BA degree at the University of Hamburg in 2013. From January 2014 to March 2020, Thering was employed as an executive assistant at the care services provider Pflegen & Wohnen Hamburg GmbH.

Political commitment

Local affairs 

Dennis Thering has been a member of the CDU since 2001. He acts both as chairman of the CDU in Alstertal and as district chairman of the CDU Wandsbek. Between 2004 and 2008, he was a member of the local committee Alstertal where he was appointed deputy group leader. From 2008 to 2011, Thering was a directly elected member of the Alstertal-Walddoerfer constituency for the Wandsbek district assembly. During this time, he was the spokesperson for the Alstertal region as well as the representative of the sports department of the CDU Wandsbek parliamentary group.

State parliament 
Thering has been both a member of the Hamburg Parliament and a member of the state board of the CDU Hamburg since 2011. In the 2015 state elections, Thering was reelected into the state parliament via a direct mandate in the Alstertal-Walddörfer constituency. He was deputy chairman of the CDU parliamentary group until spring of 2020: At its constituent parliamentary group meeting on March 18, 2020, the CDU parliamentary group unanimously elected Thering as their new chairman.

In the general election on February 23, 2020, Thering was once again appointed as the top candidate of the CDU Hamburg in the Alstertal-Walddörfer constituency. On February 23, 2020, he - for the third time - was reelected as a member of the Hamburg Parliament

Memberships and cultural involvement 
Additionally to his political commitment, Thering is a member of the following regional clubs and associations:

 Heimatverein Hamburg-Hummelsbüttel
 Bürgerverein Sasel-Poppenbüttel von 1955
 Förderverein der Freiwilligen Feuerwehr Hummelsbüttel
 Duvenstedter Sportverein von 1969
 Bürgerverein Duvenstedt/Wohldorf-Ohlstedt
 Verein Heimatbund Hamburg-Lemsahl-Mellingstedt
 Vereinigung Duvenstedt (seit 1961)
 Freundeskreis des Hospital zum Heiligen Geist
 Freundeskreis von „Hände für Kinder“
 Stiftungsrat der Curator-Stiftung für das Hospital zum Heiligen Geist in Poppenbüttel

Sources

External links 

 Dennis Thering • CDU-Bürgerschaftsfraktion Hamburg
 German Resume Dennis Thering
 Offizielle Website von Dennis Thering
 Dennis Thering with the CDU Alstertal
 Abgeordnetenwatch
 Podcast

Christian Democratic Union of Germany politicians
21st-century German politicians
1984 births
Living people
University of Hamburg alumni
Members of the Hamburg Parliament